Henry Archibald Richardson (18 July 1879 – 7 March 1981) was an Australian rules footballer who played with  in the Victorian Football Association (VFA) from 1902 through 1904. He served in the Australian Army during World War I, later moving to the United States and serving in the United States Army during World War II. He died at the age of 101 in March 1981. For many years he was credited with playing for St Kilda in the VFL and was known as the longest-lived St Kilda player, however these games are now credited to other players.

References

External links 

1879 births
1981 deaths
Australian centenarians
Men centenarians
Richmond Football Club (VFA) players
Australian rules footballers from Victoria (Australia)
Australian military personnel of World War I
United States Army personnel of World War II
Australian emigrants to the United States